Cephalotropis is a genus of baleen whale belonging to the extinct family Cetotheriidae. Its type species is Cephalotropis coronatus.

Description
Cephalotropis is diagnosed by the following features: a long sagittal crest, a more anteriorly produced angle of the supraoccipital angle, among other features. There is insufficient information to determine how big Cephalotropis was, but it probably grew to about 16–20 feet long.

Taxonomy
Cephalotropis coronatus was originally described from the Late Miocene (Tortonian) St. Mary's Formation of St. Mary's Formation, Maryland, based on the holotype USNM 9352. A second species of the genus, C. nectus, was named for a specimen from a Tortonian-aged formation in Portugal, but is now considered a junior synonym of C. coronatus.

References

Baleen whales
Miocene cetaceans
Prehistoric mammals of North America
Prehistoric cetacean genera
Fossil taxa described in 1896